Sharo-Argun (Şara-Orga) is a rural locality (a selo) in the Shatoysky District in Chechnya, Russia. Population:

References

Rural localities in Shatoysky District